The Joseph Starr Dunham House is a historic house at 418 Broadway in Van Buren, Arkansas.  Built c. 1870, this -story wood-frame house is a fine local example of Gothic Revival architecture, with a steeply-pitched side-gable roof that has front-facing gable dormers decorated with sawn woodwork, and a full-width front porch with spiral posts and delicate brackets.  Joseph Starr Dunham, the owner, was a Connecticut native who settled in Van Buren in 1859 and began publishing the Van Buren Press; the house was still in family hands when it was listed on the National Register of Historic Places in 1976.

See also
National Register of Historic Places listings in Crawford County, Arkansas

References

Houses on the National Register of Historic Places in Arkansas
Gothic Revival architecture in Arkansas
Houses completed in 1870
Houses in Crawford County, Arkansas
National Register of Historic Places in Crawford County, Arkansas
Buildings and structures in Van Buren, Arkansas